Club Sportivo Firenze also known as CS Firenze or simply Firenze, was an Italian football club from Florence, Tuscany, that was founded in 1903. The club is most noted for competing in the early Italian Football Championship competitions (below the very top division), before in 1926 becoming one of two Florence-based clubs that merged to form Fiorentina.

External links
Club Sportivo Firenze Official site

References

ACF Fiorentina
Defunct football clubs in Italy
Football clubs in Tuscany
Association football clubs established in 1903
1903 establishments in Italy
1926 disestablishments in Italy